Nannarasi Radhe is a Kannada language television drama that premiered on Colors Kannada channel on 3 February 2020. Episodes are also streamed on Viacom's online platform Voot. It stars Abhinav Vishwanathan and Kaustuba Mani as protagonists. It received the Best Serial Award in 2021 Anubandha Awards.

Plot 

A series of events lands Inchara (Kaustubha Mani) at Agastya Enterprises where the Rathod family scion, Agastya Rathod (Abhinav Vishwanathan) works, a man she detests. Both have a secret they would like to keep, but Agastya finds Inchara's secret and she is on the threshold of landing in a crisis. Agastya capitalises on the secret and blackmails Innchara to act as his girlfriend to realise his wish of setting up a business & permanently settle in America. While acting as couple in love, series of events bring Agastya and Innchara closer as friends. Agastya asks for Inchara's help in his quest to find his biological mother & Inchara agrees by promising to help & stand by him in his quest. The identity and whereabouts of his mother remains a mystery to him, which his Father is reluctant to disclose for reasons only known to him. Inchara chances upon his mother's secret and when she is about to disclose it, Santhosh Rathod (Agastya's father) requests and convinces Innchara to not reveal the truth to anyone on the basis of a promise. The reason why Innchara agreed to not disclose the truth to Agastya is a mystery to viewers .

Rathods invite Inchara and her family for  Janamashtmi celebrations at Rathod Mansion . On that day series of events unfold and Agastya-Inchara's fake love story is exposed to both the families . Agastya is upset that Inchara has hidden his mothers truth & broken her promise to him. Agastya's aunt Meenakshi insults Inchara and her family, questions Inchara's integrity and character and calls her a gold digger . Sunitha ( Inchara's mother ) vows to get Inchara married into a much richer family than Rathods and challenges Rathods that Inchara's marriage will be in next 15 days to safeguard her family's & daughter's honour.

Inchara's marriage is fixed with Rishab, a successful corporate professional in USA however Inchara only agrees to it to fulfill her mother's wish & for the sake of her mother's happiness & honour. Agastya determined to find about his mother starts to pester Inchara to tell him his mother's secret before leaving for US and is present at every ritual of her wedding. Inchara is feeling guilty for betraying him and her family are fed up with his antics. On the Wedding day, right at the time of muhurtham Agastya rushes to the wedding man-tap and ties the knot to Inchara and everybody in the mantap are left shocked by Agastya's actions. Sunitha and everybody else present at the wedding accuse Agastya for ruining Inchara's life for his selfish motive of getting to know about his biological mother. However the reason why Agastya married Inchara remains undisclosed & only known to Agastya.( Possibly to find about his mother or Possibly out of love for her )

Agastya challenges Inchara's family that he will stay in their house for 7 days & convince her to accept him. At the end of 7th day if Inchara decides that the marriage is unacceptable to her then he will sign the annulment paper and go away from her life. But Agasthya manages to get Inchara to  his house, after her mother disowns her. Inchara is welcomed happily by Agathyas family members, except lavanya, Shravan and atthe.

After a few Days Inchara's mother accept their marriage..Agastya decides to leave the house in search of his mother. But he is stopped as the truth about his mother is out. After that he apologies to his father. Shravan's true identity is exposed. The next day on the way to Shreya's wedding Inchara vows to make Agastya fall in love with her.

After members from Agastyas family enters wedding hall, Inchara and Agasthya also enters the entrance door ,there indrani members attack Agasthya ,huge fight happens later Bala gives an idea for Agasthya.According to Bala advice Agasthya-Inchara marries for the 3rd time. While tying knot Inchara disagrees as he didn't answer to her most important question "Why did u tie a knot to me", Agasthya says he would say her later. Finally agaschara got married 3 times. Afterwards they entered Shreyas wedding as they were the real Bride and Groom.Abhijith from other side to make his mom happy he used mike n called Agasthya.

A series of events, leads Agastya, on digging more about Indrani, that she is the person to have locked her sister (aka Vaidehi),  due to an unfortunate incident, that occurred a long long time ago. After a few days, on Santhosh's Birthday party, an unexpected incident, causes Sudha to reveal that Agastya is actually an adopted son of Santhosh-Vaidehi, and also his real father was shot by Indrani, before locking up Vaidehi. This deeply saddens Agastya, and thereafter continues to live with his family ever after. 

A few days pass by, and when all the family members are at the temple, Vaidehi is attacked by Indrani, and Vaidehi chose her family eventually, and reveals that , she has a daughter (named Ashwini), who has been locked up, by indrani, somewhere unknown. This enrages everyone, thus causing Agastya-Inchara, to uncover the mystery, which leads them to a house, where a 23- year old Girl is locked by Indrani. Then, she is taken home, where DNA reports also confirm she is the daughter of Santhosh-Vaidehi. But, a few hours pass by, which also reveals that Indrani is fooling Ashwini, by faking her birth, and also lying that She was her daughter, not Vaidehi's , and she was abandoned by her original parents, 23 years ago. Then, Ashwini makes all plans to put off the happiness in the house, but fails in every attempt. 

Then, a few days pass by, when Lavanya, the daughter of Sudha, returns, now changed drastically, into begging, after her husband betrayed her, and threw her on the streets, the day they left after kidnapping her. Inchara and Lavanya , uncover that Ashwini has some background. They soon discover that, she was a topper in some college, and she was being lied by Indrani. So, eventually, Ashwini goes to Indrani's house one random day, and overhears the conversation by Hemaraj and Indrani, on how she is being lied. When Indrani gets to know about this, she tries to explain herself, but in vain . 

Climax

In the final climax episodes, Indrani again reappears and tries to poison the family members, but , everyone knew about the plan, thus, leading to her arrest. As Indrani leaves, inchara faints, which also reveals that Inchara is pregnant, and the following day, Inchara's baby-shower is organized with which the series ends.

Cast 
 Abhinav Vishwanathan as Agastya Rathod-Vaidehi's son; Santosh Rathod's step son; Vaidehi's son ; Ashwini's half brother; Inchara's husband; Sudha and Sathish's nephew; Lavanya, Urvi and shivam's step cousin.
 Kaustuba Mani as Inchara Agastya Rathod-Agasthya Rathod's wife; Sunitha's elder daughter; Apoorva's elder sister; Ravi's niece; Tarun and shivani's cousin.Rishab's ex-fiancée .
 Sihi Kahi Chandru as Santhosh Rathod- Vaidehi husband ;Agasthya's step father;Ashwini's father; sudha and sathish's brother; 
 Hema V Bellur as Vaidehi -Santosh Rathod's wife; Agasthya and Ashwini's mother; Indrani and Hemaraju's half sister.
 Amoolya Gowda as Ashwini -Santhosh & Vaidehi's Daughter;Agasthya's half sister; Lavanya, Urvi and shivam's cousin;Sudha and Sathish's niece. 
 Vyjayanthi Kashi as Sudha -Santhosh& Satish's sister ;Lavanya's Mother;shravan's mother in law; Vaidehi and meenakhi's sister in law; Agasthya, shivam,Urvi and Ashwini's aunt. 
 Tejaswini Prakash as Lavanya -Agastya's step cousin; Sudha's Daughter;Shivam,Urvi and Ashwini's cousin; shravan's wife; Santosh and Sathish's niece.
 Arun Kumar as Sharavn-  Lavanya's Husband;Sudha's son in law; 
 Pradeep Chandra Kuthpady as  Sathish Rathod; Santosh & Sudha's Brother;Meenakshi's Husband;Shivam and Urvi's father; Ashwini,Lavanya and Agastya's uncle. 
 Veena Rao as Meenakshi Rathod;Sathish's wife; Shivam and Urvi's mother; 
 Sahana Shetty as Urvi Rathod -Sathish and Meenakshi's daughter; Agastya's step cousin;Shivam's sister; Ashwini and Lavanya's cousin; Sudha and santhosh's niece. 
 Padmini as Sunitha -Inchara's & Apoorva'smother;Ravi's younger sister; Tarun and shivani's aunt;Agastya's mother in law. 
 Shravyagowda as Apoorva "Appu"Vaidya Inchara's younger sister; Sunitha's Daughter;Ravi's niece. Tarun and shivani's cousin. Agastya's sister in law. 
 Raghavndera as Ravi -Sunitha's Brother ;Mohini's Husband;Tarun and shivani's father; Inchara and Apoorva's uncle. 
 Akshata Radhakrishna as Mohini -Ravi's wife; Tarun and shivani's mother; Sunitha's sister in law; Inchara and Apoorva's aunt. 
 Viharika Pooja as Shivani -Ravi and Mohini's daughter;  Inchara and Apoorva's cousin;Tarun's sister; Sunitha's niece. 
 Arfath Shariff as Tarun -Ravi and Mohini's son;  Inchara and Apoorva's cousin;Shivani's brother; Sunitha's nephew.

Adaptations

References 

2020 Indian television series debuts
Indian television soap operas
Kannada-language television shows
Serial drama television series
Colors Kannada original programming